Fritz Von Goering (born John Gabor ) is an American retired professional wrestler, known for playing a villainous German character in the 1950s, 1960s and 1970s.

Biography
John Gabor was born in Chicago, Illinois, to an Irish-American family. In 1939, his family relocated to the south of San Francisco, when he was about 10. He became interested in combat fighting at a young age when his uncle brought him to boxing matches and he grew to admire profession wrestlers such as Lou Thesz and Bobby Managoff, both of whom he would wrestle with later in his career. Gabor was trained in gyms, where wrestlers "beat him up badly just to see how much he wanted to learn". According to Mercury News, "Von Goering is one of the few successful wrestlers who does not have an amateur background; he isn't the product of a wrestling academy, nor did he rise up through the college or Olympic ranks."

Gabor started wrestling in aftermath of World War II, when it was common for heels (villains) to be portrayed as being from countries in the Axis Powers. Despite not being of German descent, he was billed as "Fritz von Ulm", until a promoter in Minnesota altered it to include the Goering surname, which was based on Nazi Party figure Hermann Göring. As part of his character, he was billed as being from various German cities, but in reality had never been out of the United States at that point. Eventually his character was modified to be of East German origin, after relations with West Germany softened during the Cold War.

During his career, he captured several tag team championships. In 1962, he won the NWA Pacific Northwest Heavyweight Championship. Frequent rivals included Thesz and Managoff, as well as Dick Hutton, Pat O'Connor, and Bronko Nagurski. He was also paired against Buddy Rogers; Von Goering stated that he "hated [Roger's] guts offstage as well as on". He finished his career in Roy Shire's Big Time Wrestling promotion, where he teamed with Luke Graham.

After retiring in 1973, Gabor moved to Campbell, California, with his wife, Kay. He found work as a truck driver and a car salesman, which he said he sometimes found more difficult than wrestling. At the behest of Thesz, Gabor supported the George Tragos/Lou Thesz Professional Wrestling Hall of Fame after its creation in 1999. In 2009, he was personally inducted into the hall of fame, which typically inducts wrestlers with a background in amateur wrestling. Mike Chapman, then-executive director of the museum which oversaw the hall of fame stated: "Even though he never had an amateur background, Fritz was voted in quite easily, frankly, because the hall of fame recognized the kind of respect he had in the ring."

Championships and accomplishments
George Tragos/Lou Thesz Professional Wrestling Hall of Fame
 Class of 2009
NWA San Francisco
NWA World Tag Team Championship (San Francisco version) (1 time) – with Gene Dubuque
Pacific Northwest Wrestling
NWA Pacific Northwest Heavyweight Championship (1 time)
NWA Pacific Northwest Tag Team Championship (2 times) - with Maurice Vachon (1), Kurt von Poppenheim (1)
Stampede Wrestling
Alberta Tag Team Championship (1 time) - with Charro Azteca
Western States Sports
NWA International Tag Team Championship (1 time) - with Mike Padosis

References

External links 
 
 Fritz Von Goering at the National Wrestling Hall of Fame and Museum

1920s births
21st-century professional wrestlers
American male professional wrestlers
American people of Irish descent
Faux German professional wrestlers
Fictional Nazis
Living people
NWA International Tag Team Champions
Professional wrestlers from Illinois
Year of birth missing (living people)